Al Basil High School for Superiors (Arabic: ثانوية الباسل للمتفوقين) is a High school that was founded in Sweida Syria( also pronounced "Swaida") and in many other cities in Syria like Aleppo to provide secondary education excl
usively for superior students. Students are required to pass several exams after finishing elementary school in order to be enrolled.

References
 http://sy.geoview.info/mdrst_alshhyd_basl_alasd_llmtfwqyn,103482010w
 http://www.esyria.sy/esuweda/index.php?p=stories&category=round&filename=201003211200042

Schools in Syria